Till Wöschler (born 9 June 1991 in Saarbrücken) is a German javelin thrower. He represents the sports club LAZ Zweibrücken.

Career

At the 2010 World Junior Championships in Athletics, Wöschler won gold with a distance of 82.52 m, a national junior record for which he received the IAAF rising star award

Personal bests

References

External links

1991 births
Living people
German male javelin throwers
Sportspeople from Saarbrücken